Alain Vivien (born August 20, 1938) is a French Socialist Party (PS) politician, best known for chairing (1998–2002) the French Mission Interministérielle pour la Lutte contre les Sectes, MILS, a ministerial organization designed to observe the activities of various religious organizations defined as "Sectes" (cults).

Early career
He was mayor of Combs-la-Ville in 1977–1983 and 1989–1992. In 1983 he was elected to the French National Assembly for Seine-et-Marne as a PS candidate. The author of a report on cults requested by Prime Minister Pierre Mauroy in 1982, he was Secretary of State under Édith Cresson in 1991–1992. From 1997 to 1998 he was president of the Centre contre les manipulations mentales.

Awards
Leipzig Human Rights Award, May 11, 2002

See also
 About-Picard law
 Status of religious freedom in France
 List of anti-cult organizations and individuals

References

  Pourquoi la bataille anti-sectes a échoué ?  ("Why did the fight against cults fail?") by Thomas Lardeur, VSD, August 22 to 28, 2002
 CESNUR, Anonymous, Innocents Abroad: French Anti-Cultists, Mission Support China’s Anti-Cult Campaign  (Retrieved October, 2005)
 Le Parisien, June 19, 2002.
  Sectes : Alain Vivien placé sous protection policière  L'Humanité, January 14, 1999 .
 Council of Europe, Report regarding FECRIS by Dick Marty: Doc 10470 of 7 March 2005

1938 births
Living people
People from Melun
Socialist Party (France) politicians
Critics of new religious movements